Trevor John Wood (born 3 November 1968) is a former footballer who played as a goalkeeper. He played 130 league games in the English Football League, 100 league games in the League of Ireland, and won one international cap for Northern Ireland in 1995.

He began his career at Brighton & Hove Albion, but did not feature in the first team before he signed with Port Vale in May 1988. Mostly a back-up keeper for the "Valiants", he moved on to Walsall in May 1994. He helped the "Saddlers" to promotion out of the Third Division in 1994–95, before he signed with Hereford United in 1997. He then moved to Ireland to play for St Patrick's Athletic, and helped his new club to the League of Ireland title in 1997–98 and 1998–99, before he retired in 2001.

Playing career
Wood was a squad member for Brighton & Hove Albion before having a successful trial with John Rudge's Port Vale in May 1988. He kept a clean sheet on his debut; a 2–0 home win over Huddersfield Town on 3 October 1988. Despite this he was used mainly as a reserve keeper, and made only two appearances in the Third Division as back-up to Mark Grew and loanee Mike Stowell during the promotion campaign of 1988–89. He played just three Second Division games in 1989–90, with Grew retaining his place between the sticks at Vale Park. Wood earned the first team jersey in August 1990. He injured his thigh however, in a 2–0 defeat at Oldham Athletic on 16 February 1991, and took two months to win his first team place back. He made 37 appearances in all competitions in 1990–91, being preferred ahead of Grew. In August 1991 he once more fell out of favour, as Grew played every minute of the 1991–92 campaign. Wood was in goal for the 4–3 defeat on penalties to Go Ahead Eagles in the TNT Tournament on 9 August 1992, a tournament the Vale still managed to win. He started the 1992–93 season as first choice keeper, but lost his place to new signing Paul Musselwhite after five league games, having conceded a penalty at Vetch Field in an 'off the ball' incident with a Swansea player. At the end of the 1993–94 season, Wood was given a free transfer, and signed with Walsall in May 1994.

The "Saddlers" won promotion out of the Third Division as runners-up in 1994–95 under the stewardship of Chris Nicholl. They then went on to finish eleventh in the Second Division in 1995–96, before Wood moved on to Graham Turner's Hereford United in the 1996–97 campaign. The "Bulls" finished bottom of the Football League, and were relegated into the Conference.

He then signed for St. Patrick's Athletic and played in the Champions League preliminary round against Celtic in 1998, keeping a clean sheet in a 0–0 draw at Celtic Park. Celtic won the second leg 2–0 at Tolka Park. The "Saints" won the League of Ireland title in 1997–98 and 1998–99, also boasting the best defensive record on both occasions. However they dropped to sixth and fifth in 1999–2000 and 2000–01, and Wood left the club, having made 100 league appearances.

International career
FIFA regulations at the time allowed a player born outside of the United Kingdom with a British passport to choose which national team he wanted to represent, despite the Jersey Football Association having county football association status within England's Football Association. Wood was the first player to take advantage of the lax regulations when he was called up for a qualifying game against Republic of Ireland for UEFA Euro 1996 in March 1995.

Wood earned a Northern Ireland cap on 11 October 1995 during the same qualifying campaign, coming on for Alan Fettis at half-time in a 4–0 win over Liechtenstein at the Sportpark Eschen-Mauren. He had been suggested to coach Bryan Hamilton by Chris Nicholl, his manager at Walsall. He then slipped down the international pecking order behind Fettis, Tommy Wright, Roy Carroll, and Aidan Davison. On 26 March 1996, he played in a rare Northern Ireland B team game, a 3–0 win over Norway Olympic XI at The Showgrounds in Coleraine.

Career statistics
Source:

Honours
Walsall
Football League Third Division second-place promotion: 1994–95

St Patrick's Athletic
League of Ireland: 1997–98 & 1998–99

References

1968 births
Living people
People from Saint Helier
Jersey people of Irish descent
Jersey footballers
Northern Ireland international footballers
Northern Ireland B international footballers
Association football goalkeepers
Brighton & Hove Albion F.C. players
Port Vale F.C. players
Walsall F.C. players
Hereford United F.C. players
St Patrick's Athletic F.C. players
English Football League players
League of Ireland players